Stukolkino is a rural locality (a village) in Bulgakovsky Selsoviet, Ufimsky District, Bashkortostan, Russia. The population was 441 as of 2010. There are 15 streets.

Geography 
Stukolkino is located 32 km south of Ufa (the district's administrative centre) by road. Iskino is the nearest rural locality.

References 

Rural localities in Ufimsky District